The Flint Generals were a minor professional ice hockey team based in Flint, Michigan. They were a member of the International Hockey League and played their home games at Perani Arena and Event Center. The Generals won two league championship Colonial Cups in the Colonial Hockey League and United Hockey League.

History
Flint had been home to minor professional hockey in some incarnation since 1969, except a one-year break in the 1990–91 season. This incarnation of the Flint Generals came about in the 1993–94 season after the Colonial Hockey League's (CoHL) Flint Bulldogs owner Skip Probst moved the Bulldogs from Flint to Utica, New York. The following summer, Dr. Khaled M. Shukairy was granted an expansion franchise in the CoHL to play in Flint.

After a fan vote, "Generals" had been voted on by the fans to be the name of the new franchise after the original Generals' team that relocated to Saginaw in 1985. Flint won their first Colonial Cup against the Thunder Bay Senators in the 1995–96 season, in which the Generals claimed the championship in a six-game upset and won the final game by a score of 9–0. This team included such players as Kevin Kerr, who would later break the all time minor league hockey scoring record and coach the Generals; Robin Bouchard, who was traded early the next season in a lopsided trade that did not favor the Generals; Andrei Mezin, the goalie who would go on to play for his native Belarus in the Olympics and upset Sweden; and female goaltender, Erin Whitten.

The second Colonial Cup came in a 4–0 sweep of the Generals rival, the Quad City Mallards, in 2000. The Generals were coached by former NHL player Doug Shedden and included former NHL players Bobby Reynolds, Mark Major, and Nick Stajduhar, as well as two 100 point scorers in Ross Wilson and Don Parsons, UHL Defenseman of the Year Gary Roach, late season additions Cory Cyrenne and Vladmir Serov, and goalie Mark Richards. Serov and Cyrenne totaled 60 points in 37 regular season games, and in the 2000 finals, Serov scored the game-winning goal with 50 seconds left in game three, and the game-winning goal with 3:52 left in game four to preserve the victories for the Generals.

After several years of mediocre hockey and questionable ownership, the Generals finished the 2009–10 season on a hot streak, clinching the final Turner Cup playoff berth on the final day of the season. The Generals faced the Muskegon Lumberjacks in the first round of the Turner Cup playoffs, and after falling behind three games to one, came back to win the series in seven games. The Generals then fell to the Fort Wayne Komets in a five-game series; the Generals only win in the series was a 7–6 overtime win in Game 3. Despite the turnaround in 2009–10 and rumors of more stable ownership taking over, the Generals folded when Perani Arena management decided to give the arena lease to the junior Michigan Warriors of the North American Hockey League.

Championships

Season-by-season results

Retired numbers
 #1 — Bob Perani
 #5 — Stephan Brochu
 #16 — Doug Manchak
 #20 — Kevin Kerr
 #77 — Brett MacDonald

References

External links
 Flint Generals official site

Ice hockey teams in Flint, Michigan
International Hockey League (2007–2010) teams
Professional ice hockey teams in Michigan
Ice hockey clubs established in 1993
Sports clubs disestablished in 2010
Chicago Blackhawks minor league affiliates
New Jersey Devils minor league affiliates
1993 establishments in Michigan
2010 disestablishments in Michigan